Behice Sultan ("Happy"; 6 August 1848 – 30 November 1876) was an Ottoman princess, daughter of Sultan Abdulmejid I and Nesrin Hanım. She was the half-sister of Sultans Murad V, Abdul Hamid II, Mehmed V, and Mehmed VI.

Early life
Behice Sultan was born on 6 August 1848 in the Çırağan Palace. Her father was Sultan Abdulmejid I, and her mother was Nesrin Hanım. She was the second child of her mother. She had three brothers, Şehzade Mehmed Ziyaeddin, two years elder then her,  and two twin brothers Şehzade Mehmed Nizameddin and Şehzade Mehmed Bahaeddin, two years younger than her. After her mother's death in 1853, She was adopted by one other Abdülmejid's consort, Şayan Kadın, who no had child for her own.

Marriage

Engagement
Behice contracted tuberculosis as a child and lived all her life in isolation and supervised by foreign doctors. Her family, in particular her half-sisters Refia Sultan and Seniha Sultan often wrote her letters to cheer her up. Behice was frustrated by her isolation and envied the freedom and health of her sisters. She was ever very sensibile and delicate. Her greatest wish was to get married. Her father prepared her dowry and chose a groom to make her happy, but he always delayed the wedding because he didn't think she was healthy enough. When her uncle Abdülaziz ascended the throne, she also asked him, who finally said yes and arranged an engagement for her.

He chose Hamid Halil Bey, the son of Mehmed Nurullah Bey, and the grandson of Halil Hamid Pasha, and six years younger than her. In 1875, her uncle, Sultan Abdulaziz betrothed her to him. On that occasion, Refia wrote to Behice that she had seen her fiancée through the window and that he had seemed handsome, polite and well dressed.

Illness
Tuberculosis took its victims in the palace as elsewhere in the nineteenth century. Among them was Behice Sultan. There is extant a touching letter to her from one Feleksu Kalfa, herself sick with malaria. The time of Behice's marriage was approaching, and Feleksu was happy for her that she would be going to her own palace, but at the same time, she was worried about her health. "You will be going to the country," she wrote, "where Pertev Kalfa knows many medicines." Behice was thought to be well enough to be married.

Wedding
Abdulaziz had ordered her trousseaux; however, he died in June 1876, and was thus completely unable to address any more issues regarding her wedding, which, in turn, got further delayed because of the death of her younger half-brother Şehzade Mehmed Burhaneddin in November 1876. Finally, the wedding took place on 16 November 1876, during the reign of her elder half-brother Sultan Abdul Hamid II. The couple was given a palace at Kuruçeşme, on the Bosphorus.

Death
Behice Sultan died of tuberculosis a mere two weeks after her wedding, on 30 November 1876, at the age of twenty-eight. She was buried in the mausoleum of Nakşidil Sultan located at Fatih Mosque, Istanbul. Her possessions were partly distributed to his sisters, in particular Naile Sultan and Mediha Sultan, and partly sold.

See also
 List of Ottoman princesses

Ancestry

References

Sources
 

1848 births
1876 deaths
19th-century Ottoman princesses